Newtownstewart railway station served Newtownstewart in  County Tyrone in Northern Ireland.

The Londonderry and Enniskillen Railway opened the station on 9 May 1852. It was taken over by the Great Northern Railway (Ireland) in 1883.

It closed on 15 February 1965.

Routes

References

Disused railway stations in County Tyrone
Railway stations opened in 1852
Railway stations closed in 1965
1852 establishments in Ireland
1965 disestablishments in Northern Ireland

Railway stations in Northern Ireland opened in 1852